Von Neumann may refer to:

 John von Neumann (1903–1957), a Hungarian American mathematician
 Von Neumann family
 Von Neumann (surname), a German surname
 Von Neumann (crater), a lunar impact crater

See also
 Von Neumann algebra
 Von Neumann architecture
 Von Neumann conjecture
 Von Neumann entropy
 Von Neumann machine (disambiguation)
 Von Neumann neighborhood
 Von Neumann universe